Ludwig Eduard Boltzmann (20 February 1844 – 5 September 1906) was an Austrian physicist and philosopher. His greatest achievements were the development of statistical mechanics, and the statistical explanation of the second law of thermodynamics. In 1877 he provided the current definition of entropy, where Ω is the number of microstates whose energy equals the system's energy, interpreted as a measure of statistical disorder of a system. Max Planck named the constant  the Boltzmann constant.

Statistical mechanics is one of the pillars of modern physics. It describes how macroscopic observations (such as temperature and pressure) are related to microscopic parameters that fluctuate around an average. It connects thermodynamic quantities (such as heat capacity) to microscopic behavior, whereas, in classical thermodynamics, the only available option would be to measure and tabulate such quantities for various materials.

Biography

Childhood and education
Boltzmann was born in Erdberg, a suburb of Vienna. His father, Ludwig Georg Boltzmann, was a revenue official. His grandfather, who had moved to Vienna from Berlin, was a clock manufacturer, and Boltzmann's mother, Katharina Pauernfeind, was originally from Salzburg. He received his primary education at the home of his parents. Boltzmann attended high school in Linz, Upper Austria. When Boltzmann was 15, his father died.

Starting in 1863, Boltzmann studied mathematics and physics at the University of Vienna. He received his doctorate in 1866 and his venia legendi in 1869. Boltzmann worked closely with Josef Stefan, director of the institute of physics. It was Stefan who introduced Boltzmann to Maxwell's work.

Academic career
In 1869 at age 25, thanks to a letter of recommendation written by Josef Stefan, Boltzmann was appointed full Professor of Mathematical Physics at the University of Graz in the province of Styria. In 1869 he spent several months in Heidelberg working with Robert Bunsen and Leo Königsberger and in 1871 with Gustav Kirchhoff and Hermann von Helmholtz in Berlin. In 1873 Boltzmann joined the University of Vienna as Professor of Mathematics and there he stayed until 1876.

In 1872, long before women were admitted to Austrian universities, he met Henriette von Aigentler, an aspiring teacher of mathematics and physics in Graz. She was refused permission to audit lectures unofficially. Boltzmann supported her decision to appeal, which was successful. On 17 July 1876 Ludwig Boltzmann married Henriette; they had three daughters: Henriette (1880), Ida (1884) and Else (1891); and a son, Arthur Ludwig (1881). Boltzmann went back to Graz to take up the chair of Experimental Physics. Among his students in Graz were Svante Arrhenius and Walther Nernst. He spent 14 happy years in Graz and it was there that he developed his statistical concept of nature.

Boltzmann was appointed to the Chair of Theoretical Physics at the University of Munich in Bavaria, Germany in 1890.

In 1894, Boltzmann succeeded his teacher Joseph Stefan as Professor of Theoretical Physics at the University of Vienna.

Final years and death

Boltzmann spent a great deal of effort in his final years defending his theories. He did not get along with some of his colleagues in Vienna, particularly Ernst Mach, who became a professor of philosophy and history of sciences in 1895. That same year Georg Helm and Wilhelm Ostwald presented their position on energetics at a meeting in Lübeck. They saw energy, and not matter, as the chief component of the universe. Boltzmann's position carried the day among other physicists who supported his atomic theories in the debate. In 1900, Boltzmann went to the University of Leipzig, on the invitation of Wilhelm Ostwald. Ostwald offered Boltzmann the professorial chair in physics, which became vacant when Gustav Heinrich Wiedemann died. After Mach retired due to bad health, Boltzmann returned to Vienna in 1902. In 1903, Boltzmann, together with Gustav von Escherich and Emil Müller, founded the Austrian Mathematical Society. His students included Karl Přibram, Paul Ehrenfest and Lise Meitner.

In Vienna, Boltzmann taught physics and also lectured on philosophy. Boltzmann's lectures on natural philosophy were very popular and received considerable attention. His first lecture was an enormous success. Even though the largest lecture hall had been chosen for it, the people stood all the way down the staircase. Because of the great successes of Boltzmann's philosophical lectures, the Emperor invited him for a reception at the Palace.

In 1906, Boltzmann's deteriorating mental condition forced him to resign his position, and his symptoms indicate he experienced what would today be diagnosed as bipolar disorder. Four months later he died by suicide on 5 September 1906, by hanging himself while on vacation with his wife and daughter in Duino, near Trieste (then Austria).
He is buried in the Viennese Zentralfriedhof. His tombstone bears the inscription of Boltzmann's entropy formula: .

Philosophy

Boltzmann's kinetic theory of gases seemed to presuppose the reality of atoms and molecules, but almost all German philosophers and many scientists like Ernst Mach and the physical chemist Wilhelm Ostwald disbelieved their existence.

Physics
Boltzmann's most important scientific contributions were in kinetic theory, including for motivating the Maxwell–Boltzmann distribution as a description of molecular speeds in a gas. Maxwell–Boltzmann statistics and the Boltzmann distribution remain central in the foundations of classical statistical mechanics. They are also applicable to other phenomena that do not require quantum statistics and provide insight into the meaning of temperature.

Most chemists, since the discoveries of John Dalton in 1808, and James Clerk Maxwell in Scotland and Josiah Willard Gibbs in the United States, shared Boltzmann's belief in atoms and molecules, but much of the physics establishment did not share this belief until decades later. Boltzmann had a long-running dispute with the editor of the preeminent German physics journal of his day, who refused to let Boltzmann refer to atoms and molecules as anything other than convenient theoretical constructs. Only a couple of years after Boltzmann's death, Perrin's studies of colloidal suspensions (1908–1909), based on Einstein's theoretical studies of 1905, confirmed the values of the Avogadro constant and the Boltzmann constant, convincing the world that the tiny particles really exist.

To quote Planck, "The logarithmic connection between entropy and probability was first stated by L. Boltzmann in his kinetic theory of gases". This famous formula for entropy S is

where kB is the Boltzmann constant, and ln is the natural logarithm. W is Wahrscheinlichkeit, a German word meaning the probability of occurrence of a macrostate or, more precisely, the number of possible microstates corresponding to the macroscopic state of a system — the number of (unobservable) "ways" in the (observable) thermodynamic state of a system that can be realized by assigning different positions and momenta to the various molecules. Boltzmann's paradigm was an ideal gas of N identical particles, of which Ni are in the ith microscopic condition (range) of position and momentum.  W can be counted using the formula for permutations

where i ranges over all possible molecular conditions, and where  denotes factorial. The "correction" in the denominator account for indistinguishable particles in the same condition.

Boltzmann could also be considered one of the forerunners of quantum mechanics due to his suggestion in 1877 that the energy levels of a physical system could be discrete.

Boltzmann equation

The Boltzmann equation was developed to describe the dynamics of an ideal gas.

where ƒ represents the distribution function of single-particle position and momentum at a given time (see the Maxwell–Boltzmann distribution), F is a force, m is the mass of a particle, t is the time and v is an average velocity of particles.

This equation describes the temporal and spatial variation of the probability distribution for the position and momentum of a density distribution of a cloud of points in single-particle phase space. (See Hamiltonian mechanics.) The first term on the left-hand side represents the explicit time variation of the distribution function, while the second term gives the spatial variation, and the third term describes the effect of any force acting on the particles. The right-hand side of the equation represents the effect of collisions.

In principle, the above equation completely describes the dynamics of an ensemble of gas particles, given appropriate boundary conditions. This first-order differential equation has a deceptively simple appearance, since f can represent an arbitrary single-particle distribution function. Also, the force acting on the particles depends directly on the velocity distribution function f. The Boltzmann equation is notoriously difficult to integrate. David Hilbert spent years trying to solve it without any real success.

The form of the collision term assumed by Boltzmann was approximate. However, for an ideal gas the standard Chapman–Enskog solution of the Boltzmann equation is highly accurate. It is expected to lead to incorrect results for an ideal gas only under shock wave conditions.

Boltzmann tried for many years to "prove" the second law of thermodynamics using his gas-dynamical equation — his famous H-theorem. However the key assumption he made in formulating the collision term was "molecular chaos", an assumption which breaks time-reversal symmetry as is necessary for anything which could imply the second law. It was from the probabilistic assumption alone that Boltzmann's apparent success emanated, so his long dispute with Loschmidt and others over Loschmidt's paradox ultimately ended in his failure.

Finally, in the 1970s E.G.D. Cohen and J. R. Dorfman proved that a systematic (power series) extension of the Boltzmann equation to high densities is mathematically impossible. Consequently, nonequilibrium statistical mechanics for dense gases and liquids focuses on the Green–Kubo relations, the fluctuation theorem, and other approaches instead.

Second thermodynamics law as a law of disorder

The idea that the second law of thermodynamics or "entropy law" is a law of disorder (or that dynamically ordered states are "infinitely improbable") is due to Boltzmann's view of the second law of thermodynamics.

In particular, it was Boltzmann's attempt to reduce it to a stochastic collision function, or law of probability following from the random collisions of mechanical particles. Following Maxwell, Boltzmann modeled gas molecules as colliding billiard balls in a box, noting that with each collision nonequilibrium velocity distributions (groups of molecules moving at the same speed and in the same direction) would become increasingly disordered leading to a final state of macroscopic uniformity and maximum microscopic disorder or the state of maximum entropy (where the macroscopic uniformity corresponds to the obliteration of all field potentials or gradients). The second law, he argued, was thus simply the result of the fact that in a world of mechanically colliding particles disordered states are the most probable. Because there are so many more possible disordered states than ordered ones, a system will almost always be found either in the state of maximum disorder – the macrostate with the greatest number of accessible microstates such as a gas in a box at equilibrium – or moving towards it. A dynamically ordered state, one with molecules moving "at the same speed and in the same direction", Boltzmann concluded, is thus "the most improbable case conceivable...an infinitely improbable configuration of energy."

Boltzmann accomplished the feat of showing that the second law of thermodynamics is only a statistical fact. The gradual disordering of energy is analogous to the disordering of an initially ordered pack of cards under repeated shuffling, and just as the cards will finally return to their original order if shuffled a gigantic number of times, so the entire universe must some-day regain, by pure chance, the state from which it first set out. (This optimistic coda to the idea of the dying universe becomes somewhat muted when one attempts to estimate the timeline which will probably elapse before it spontaneously occurs.) The tendency for entropy increase seems to cause difficulty to beginners in thermodynamics, but is easy to understand from the standpoint of the theory of probability. Consider two ordinary dice, with both sixes face up. After the dice are shaken, the chance of finding these two sixes face up is small (1 in 36); thus one can say that the random motion (the agitation) of the dice, like the chaotic collisions of molecules because of thermal energy, causes the less probable state to change to one that is more probable. With millions of dice, like the millions of atoms involved in thermodynamic calculations, the probability of their all being sixes becomes so vanishingly small that the system must move to one of the more probable states.

Works

Awards and honours
In 1885 he became a member of the Imperial Austrian Academy of Sciences and in 1887 he became the President of the University of Graz. He was elected a member of the Royal Swedish Academy of Sciences in 1888 and a Foreign Member of the Royal Society (ForMemRS) in 1899. Numerous things are named in his honour.

See also

 Thermodynamics
 Statistical Mechanics

References

Further reading
 Roman Sexl & John Blackmore (eds.), "Ludwig Boltzmann – Ausgewahlte Abhandlungen", (Ludwig Boltzmann Gesamtausgabe, Band 8), Vieweg, Braunschweig, 1982.
 John Blackmore (ed.), "Ludwig Boltzmann – His Later Life and Philosophy, 1900–1906, Book One: A Documentary History", Kluwer, 1995. 
 John Blackmore, "Ludwig Boltzmann – His Later Life and Philosophy, 1900–1906, Book Two: The Philosopher", Kluwer, Dordrecht, Netherlands, 1995. 
 John Blackmore (ed.), "Ludwig Boltzmann – Troubled Genius as Philosopher", in Synthese, Volume 119, Nos. 1 & 2, 1999, pp. 1–232.
 
 Boltzmann, Ludwig Boltzmann – Leben und Briefe, ed., Walter Hoeflechner, Akademische Druck- u. Verlagsanstalt. Graz, Oesterreich, 1994
 Brush, Stephen G. (ed. & tr.), Boltzmann, Lectures on Gas Theory, Berkeley, California: U. of California Press, 1964
 Brush, Stephen G. (ed.), Kinetic Theory, New York: Pergamon Press, 1965
 
 
 
 
 Ehrenfest, P. & Ehrenfest, T. (1911) "Begriffliche Grundlagen der statistischen Auffassung in der Mechanik", in Encyklopädie der mathematischen Wissenschaften mit Einschluß ihrer Anwendungen Band IV, 2. Teil ( F. Klein and C. Müller (eds.). Leipzig: Teubner, pp. 3–90. Translated as The Conceptual Foundations of the Statistical Approach in Mechanics. New York: Cornell University Press, 1959. 
 
 
 
 
 
 
 
 
  English translation by Morton Masius of the 2nd ed. of Waermestrahlung. Reprinted by Dover (1959) & (1991). 
 Sharp, Kim (2019). Entropy and the Tao of Counting: A Brief Introduction to Statistical Mechanics and the Second Law of Thermodynamics (SpringerBriefs in Physics). Springer Nature. 
  Reprinted: Dover (1979).

External links

 
 
 Ruth Lewin Sime, Lise Meitner: A Life in Physics Chapter One: Girlhood in Vienna gives Lise Meitner's account of Boltzmann's teaching and career.
 Eftekhari, Ali, "Ludwig Boltzmann (1844–1906)." Discusses Boltzmann's philosophical opinions, with numerous quotes.
 
 
 

 
1844 births
1906 suicides
Scientists from Vienna
19th-century Austrian physicists
Thermodynamicists
Fluid dynamicists
Burials at the Vienna Central Cemetery
University of Vienna alumni
Members of the Royal Swedish Academy of Sciences
Corresponding members of the Saint Petersburg Academy of Sciences
Suicides by hanging in Austria
Foreign Members of the Royal Society
Foreign associates of the National Academy of Sciences
Mathematical physicists
Theoretical physicists
Rectors of universities in Austria
19th-century Austrian philosophers
20th-century Austrian philosophers
Members of the Göttingen Academy of Sciences and Humanities